Shilpa S Raizada (born 12 July 1990  ) is an Indian television actress. She is known for her roles of Padmini in  StarPlus's Hamari Devrani, Begum Rukhsar in Colors TV's Veer Shivaji, Shehnaaz in Zee TV's Jodha Akbar and Binny in & TV's Dilli Wali Thakur Gurls. She was seen as Surekha Akhilesh Goenka in Yeh Rishta Kya Kehlata Hai on Star Plus from 2016 to 2021.

Personal life
Shilpa Raizada was born on 12 July in Pathakhera, District betul, Madhya Pradesh, India. Raizada has completed her schooling from Little Flower High School, Pathakhera. From childhood Raizada always wanted to be an actor. In her home town Pathakhera there is no college, it is a coal mines area and a very small town, so she came to Bhopal, did her graduation from Mvm College. In Bhopal she did anchoring for Aaj Tak news channel, covered development stories on tribal people of state of Madhya Pradesh. In Bhopal she auditioned for her debut show Hamari Devrani and got selected. She has elder sister, Suman Raizada and two brothers, Saumitra and Siddharth Raizada.

Career
She started her career with Star Plus's daily soap afternoon show Hamari Devrani. She got nominated for negative lead role. After this show she continued to be busy with many shows like in Mata Ki Chowki as Sita, Jodha Akbar as Shehnaaz, Dilli Wali Thakur Gurls as Binnni. She was last seen as Surekha Akhilesh Goenka in Yeh Rishta Kya Kehlata Hai from 2016 to 2021.

Television

References

External links
 

Living people
Indian television actresses
1989 births